Jennifer Ann Mackinnon (born September 16, 1973) is an American physical oceanographer who has studied small-scale dynamical processes in oceans for more than 20 years. These processes include internal waves and ocean mixing, turbulence, sub-mesoscale instabilities, and their complex interaction. She is a professor at the Scripps Institution of Oceanography (SIO) of the University of California, San Diego (UCSD). Her research requires some fieldwork at sea to observe these processes.

Early life and education

Mackinnon graduated with a Bachelor of Arts (Major in Physics) with distinction from Swarthmore College in June 1995. In June 1999, she completed a Master of Science at the Department of Oceanography of the University of Washington. She then carried out a Ph. D. in the same department that she defended in June 2002.

Career and research

After some postdoctoral research at SIO from October 2002 to December 2003, she was secured an assistant research faculty position before being appointed associate professor and professor.

In 2021, she demonstarted with coworkers in a publication in Nature Communications that pockets of warm water from the Pacific Ocean are accelerating the melting of sea ice

Awards and recognition

 1991 – National Merit Finalist
 1999 – Geophysical Fluid Dynamics Fellowship at the Woods Hole Oceanographic Institution
 1997 - 2000 – National Defense Science and Engineering Graduate (NDSEG) Fellowship
 2011 – Scripps Graduate Teaching Award

References

External links
 Faculty profile at SIO

American oceanographers
1973 births
Living people
Physical oceanographers
Women oceanographers
University of Washington alumni
Swarthmore College alumni